The 2002 European Junior Judo Championships is an edition of the European Junior Judo Championships, organised by the International Judo Federation. It was held in Rotterdam, Netherlands, from 14 to 17 November 2002.

Medal summary

Men's events

Women's events

Source Results

Medal table

References

External links
 

 U21
European Junior Judo Championships
European Championships, U21
Judo
Judo competitions in the Netherlands
Judo
Judo, European Championships U21